Bondone (Bondù,  in local dialect) is a comune located about  southwest of Trento in Trentino in the northern Italian region Trentino-Alto Adige/Südtirol, on the border with Lombardy. It is As of 31 December 2004, it had a population of 693 and an area of  divided approximately equally between the capoluogo and the frazione Baitoni which lies on the shores of Lake Idro.

The Castello di San Giovanni, offers panoramic views of the lake, and of the valley of the Chiese, with the Dolomites of Brenta visible in the distance.

Neighbouring communes
In the province of Trento:
Tiarno di Sopra
Storo
Ledro

In the province of Brescia, Lombardy:
Bagolino
Magasa
Idro
Valvestino

Demographic evolution

References

External links
 Homepage of the city

Cities and towns in Trentino-Alto Adige/Südtirol